Aleksey Dryomin (Алексе́й Никола́евич Дрёмин) (born 10 May 1989 in Chelyabinsk) is a Russian sprinter. He competed in the 110 m hurdles event at the 2012 Summer Olympics.

References

1989 births
Living people
Sportspeople from Chelyabinsk
Russian male hurdlers
Olympic male hurdlers
Olympic athletes of Russia
Athletes (track and field) at the 2012 Summer Olympics
Russian Athletics Championships winners